"Maboroshi"/"Okaerinasai." (Illusion/Welcome Home.) is Jun Shibata's 11th single and second recut. It is also her first double A-side single as well as her last with Dreamusic. It was released on May 8, 2005 and peaked at #30.

Track listing
Maboroshi (幻; Illusion)
Okaerinasai. (おかえりなさい。; Welcome Home.)

Charts

External links
https://web.archive.org/web/20161030094458/http://www.shibatajun.com/— Shibata Jun Official Website

2005 singles
Jun Shibata songs